Jaime Álvarez Díaz (born 4 February 1986) is a Spanish football manager and former player who played as a winger. He is the current manager of Real Oviedo Vetusta.

Playing career
Álvarez was born in Oviedo, Asturias, and was a Real Oviedo youth graduate. He made his senior debut while on loan at Tercera División side CD Universidad de Oviedo in 2005, helping in their promotion to Segunda División B before renewing his loan for another season.

Back at Oviedo for the 2007–08 campaign, Álvarez featured regularly before returning to the Uni in 2009, now on a permanent contract. In 2011, he moved to fellow fourth tier side CD Covadonga, scoring a career-best 23 goals in his first season.

Álvarez joined Caudal Deportivo also in the fourth division in June 2015, achieving promotion to the third level in his first campaign. On 12 June 2017, he returned to Cova, and was a regular starter for the side until leaving on 29 June 2021.

Managerial career
In 2020, while still a player, Álvarez joined Covadonga's backroom staff, and was named manager of their Juvenil A squad. On 29 June 2021, he was appointed manager of Oviedo's reserves in Tercera División RFEF.

On 3 June 2022, after achieving promotion to Segunda Federación, Álvarez renewed his contract for a further year. On 16 October, he was named interim manager of the main squad as Bolo was sacked, but returned to his previous role two days later after the appointment of Álvaro Cervera.

Managerial statistics

References

External links
 
 
 
 

1986 births
Living people
Sportspeople from Oviedo
Spanish footballers
Segunda División B players
Tercera División players
Real Oviedo players
CD Covadonga players
Caudal Deportivo footballers
Spanish football managers
Segunda Federación managers
Tercera Federación managers
Real Oviedo Vetusta managers